Douglas W. Herndon (born 1964) is a justice of the Nevada Supreme Court.

Education 

Herndon earned his Bachelor of Science from Texas A&M University in 1986 and his Juris Doctor from the Washington and Lee University School of Law in 1990.

Legal and judicial career 

From 1990–1991 he served as an appellate law clerk in the district attorney's office and then from 1991–1996 he served as deputy district attorney. From 1996–2005 he served as chief deputy district attorney in the Special Victims Unit. In 2005 he was appointed to be a judge by Governor Kenny Guinn. From 2005–2009 he served as a District Court Judge of the Eighth Judicial District Court; from 2009–2017 he served as Chief Judge of the Criminal Division within the same court.

From 2017–2021, he has been Chief Presiding Criminal Judge of the Eighth Judicial District Court in Las Vegas.

Nevada Supreme Court service 

On November 20, 2019, Herndon announced his candidacy for the Nevada Supreme Court for 2020. On November 3, 2020, he was elected to be a justice of the Nevada Supreme Court, defeating his Democratic opponent Nevada Assemblyman Ozzie Fumo. He was sworn into office on January 4, 2021.

References

External links 

Biography on the Eighth Judicial District Court

Living people
Place of birth missing (living people)
20th-century American lawyers
21st-century American judges
21st-century American lawyers
District attorneys in Nevada
Justices of the Nevada Supreme Court
Nevada lawyers
Nevada Republicans
Nevada state court judges
Texas A&M University alumni
Washington and Lee University School of Law alumni
1964 births